Nam Ping is one of the 31 constituencies in the Yuen Long District of Hong Kong. It is one of the districts created in 1994.

The constituency returns one district councillor to the Yuen Long District Council, with an election every four years. The seat was formerly held by Zachary Wong of the Democratic Party since its creation in the 1994 DB Election.

Nam Ping constituency is loosely based southern part of Long Ping Estate and around the Long Ping station with estimated population of 13,508.

Councillors represented

Election results

2010s

2000s

1990s

Notes

References

Yuen Long
Constituencies of Hong Kong
Constituencies of Yuen Long District Council
1994 establishments in Hong Kong
Constituencies established in 1994